Marche à petits pas  (“gait with little steps”) is a type of gait disorder characterised by an abnormal short stepped gait with upright stance (in strict sense, as opposed to generally stooping short-stepped gait of Parkinson's disease), seen in various neurological (or sometimes muscular) disorders. It can be further differentiated from "Parkinsonian gait" by normal arm swing (as opposed to no arm swing in Parkinsonism). This is associated with frontal lobe white matter lesions.


Common causes
Marche à petit pas gait is seen in:
 Bilateral diffuse cortical dysfunction
 Diffuse cerebrovascular disease ('lacunar state')
 Normal pressure hydrocephalus
 Multiple sclerosis
 Parkinsonism (sometimes)
 Muscle weakness

References

Gait abnormalities
Rehabilitation medicine
Neurological disorders